The Bulgarian women's national ice hockey team represents Bulgaria in the IIHF Women's World Championship. The women's national team is controlled by Bulgarian Ice Hockey Federation. As of 2020, Bulgaria had 53 female players registered with the IIHF, down from 65 players in 2016. The Bulgarian women's national team ranked 38th in the world in 2020.

Qualification tournament for the 2010 Olympics
The Bulgaria participated in the women's qualification tournament for the 2010 Winter Olympics in Vancouver. They played four games, facing Slovakia, Croatia, Italy, and Latvia. The team lost all four games in blowouts: 0–39 against Latvia, 1–30 against Croatia, 0–41 against Italy, and a record-setting 0–82 loss to Slovakia, which remains the highest goal differential ever recorded in an IIHF sanctioned match as of 2020. Tallied in the game against Croatia, the only goal was scored by forward Olga Gospodinova and assisted by the defensemen Elina Milanova and Sofiya Iliycheva.

World Championship record
In 2011, the Bulgarian women's national team debuted at their first IIHF Women's World Championship tournament, competing in Division V. They were scheduled to compete in the 2009 Division V tournament in Gdańsk Poland, but the tournament was cancelled for financial reasons.

References

External links

IIHF profile
National Teams of Ice Hockey

Women's national ice hockey teams in Europe
 
Ice
2008 establishments in Bulgaria